The Menashe Regional Council (Mo'atza Azorit Menasheh) is a regional council near the city of Hadera, on Israel's north-central coastal plain in the southern Haifa District. It is named after the tribe of Menashe which had been allotted this region (and a much larger territory around) according to the Book of Joshua (17:1-10).

List of localities
This regional council provides various municipal services for the 21 communities within its territory:

Kibbutzim
Barkai 
Ein Shemer 
Gan Shmuel
Kfar Glikson
Lahavot Haviva 
Magal 
Ma'anit 
Metzer 
Mishmarot
Regavim

Moshavim
Ein Iron 
Gan HaShomron 
Kfar Pines
Maor 
Mei Ami 
Sde Yitzhak 
Talmei Elazar 

Arab villages
al-Arian 
Meiser 
Umm al-Qutuf

Other villages
Alonei Yitzhak
Sha'ar Menashe

See also 
 Wadi Ara

External links
Official website 

 
Regional councils in Israel
Regional councils in Haifa District